This is a partial list of rivers of Western New Guinea in Indonesia.

In alphabetical order

By mouth location
From west to east:

North coast

South coast

See also

 List of rivers of Papua New Guinea
 List of rivers of Indonesia

References

 
Western Papua